Metaman: The Merging of Humans and Machines into a Global Superorganism is a 1993 book by author Gregory Stock.  The title refers to a superorganism comprising humanity and its technology. 

While many people have had ideas about a global brain, they have tended to suppose that this can be improved or altered by humans according to their will. Metaman can be seen as a development that directs humanity's will to its own ends, whether it likes it or not, through the operation of market forces. While it is difficult to think of making a life-form based on metals that can mine its own 'food', it is possible to imagine a superorganism that incorporates humans as its "cells" and entices them to sustain it (communalness), just as our cells interwork to sustain us.

External links
 Review of Metaman, by Hans Moravec
 Review of Metaman, by Patric Hedlund

Systems theory
Cybernetics
Superorganisms
Futurology books
1993 non-fiction books